Joint Task Force Guantanamo counter-terrorism analysts assert that the Dimaj Institute "...is a known terrorist training center".

The Summary of Evidence memo prepared for 
Al Khadr Abdallah Muhammed Al Yafi's
Combatant Status Review Tribunal, 
on 14 October 2004, and the 
Summary of Evidence memo prepared for 
his first annual Administrative Review Board, on 22 September 2005, stated:
{| class="wikitable"
|
 Detainee studied for six months at the Dimaj Institute.
 The Dimaj Institute is a known terrorist training center.
|}

The Summary of Evidence memo prepared for Al Khadr Abdallah Muhammed Al Yafi's second annual review, on 19 May 2006, stated:
{| class="wikitable"
|
 The detainee studied for six months at the al Dimaj Institute in Sadah, Yemen under Sheikh Muqbuil al Wadi.
 The al Dimaj Institute (Training Center) was used for indoctrination and recruiting grounds for foreign extremists/terrorists seeking entry into other paramilitary or jihad organizations.
|}

References

Buildings and structures in Yemen
Saada Governorate